The iPod is a portable media player.

IPOD may also refer to:

 IPOD (Insoluble Protein Deposit); See JUNQ and IPOD
 Independent Party of Delaware (IPoD), a political party in the US
 Iouri Podladtchikov (born 1988), a Russian-born Swiss snowboarder, nickname ipod

See also
 iPad
 iPhone